Robert Merrill (June 4, 1917 – October 23, 2004) was an American operatic baritone and actor, who was also active in the musical theatre circuit. He received the National Medal of Arts in 1993.

Early life
Merrill was born Moishe Miller, later known as Morris Miller, in the Williamsburg section of Brooklyn, New York. He was the son of tailor Abraham Miller, originally Milstein, and his wife, Lillian (née Balaban), Jewish immigrants from Pultusk, Poland, near Warsaw. His paternal grandparents were Berl Milstein and Chana (née Mlawski), both from Pultusk, Poland.

His mother claimed to have had an operatic and concert career in Poland (a fact denied by her son in his biographies) and encouraged her son to have early voice training: he had a stutter, which wasn't apparent when singing. Merrill was inspired to pursue professional singing lessons when he saw the baritone Richard Bonelli singing Count Di Luna in a performance of Il Trovatore at the Metropolitan Opera, and paid for them with money earned as a semi-professional pitcher.

Radio and recordings

In his early radio appearances as a crooner he was sometimes billed as Merrill Miller. While singing at bar mitzvahs and weddings and Borscht Belt resorts, he met an agent, Moe Gale, who found him work at Radio City Music Hall and with the NBC Symphony Orchestra, conducted by Arturo Toscanini. With Toscanini conducting, he eventually sang in two of the maestro's NBC Symphony broadcasts of famous operas, La traviata (with Licia Albanese, in 1946), and Un ballo in maschera (with Herva Nelli, in 1954). Both of those operas were recorded and later released on both LP and CD by RCA Victor. His ranking as an important NBC performer is evidenced by his inclusion in NBC's 1947 promotional book, NBC Parade of Stars: As Heard Over Your Favorite NBC Station, displaying Sam Berman's caricatures of leading NBC personalities.

Merrill's 1944 operatic debut was in Verdi's Aida at Newark, New Jersey, with the famous tenor Giovanni Martinelli, then in the later stages of his long operatic career. Merrill, who had continued his vocal studies under Samuel Margolis made his debut at the Metropolitan Opera as winner of the Metropolitan Opera Auditions of the Air in 1945, as Germont in La traviata. Also in 1945, Merrill recorded a 78 rpm album set with Jeanette MacDonald, featuring selections from the operetta Up in Central Park; MacDonald and Merrill sang two duets together on this album.

In 1951, Merrill recorded a series of operatic duets with the Swedish tenor Jussi Björling for RCA Victor, including a world-renowned recording of "Au fond du temple saint" from the opera Les pêcheurs de perles by Georges Bizet. That same year he participated in another celebrated RCA Victor recording, Bizet's Carmen with Risë Stevens and Jan Peerce, conducted by Fritz Reiner.

In 1952 Merrill, Björling, and Victoria de los Ángeles made a widely admired RCA Victor recording of Puccini's La bohème, conducted by Sir Thomas Beecham. In 1953, Merrill, Björling, de los Angeles and Zinka Milanov recorded the complete Pagliacci and Cavalleria rusticana.

Metropolitan Opera
His role in the musical comedy film Aaron Slick from Punkin Crick (1952) led to a conflict with Sir Rudolf Bing and a brief departure from the Met in 1951. Merrill sang many different baritone roles, and after the untimely on-stage death of the celebrated Leonard Warren in 1960, became the Met's principal baritone, sharing that position in a few years with Cornell MacNeil.  In the late 1950s and early 1960s, he appeared under the direction of Alfredo Antonini in performances of arias from the Italian operatic repertoire for the open air Italian Night concert series at Lewisohn Stadium in New York City.

He was described by Time as "one of the Met's best baritones". Yet reviews were not consistently good: Opera magazine reported on a Metropolitan Opera performance of Barber of Seville in which Merrill delivered "by all odds the most insensitive impersonation of the season".  He was accused by the reviewer of "loud, coarse sounds" and "no grace, no charm, as he butchered the text and galumphed around the stage".

Later career

Merrill appeared on "Voice of Firestone" with Joanne Hill.

Merrill also continued to perform on radio and television, in nightclubs and recitals. In 1973, Merrill teamed up with Richard Tucker to present a concert at Carnegie Hall—a first for the two "vocal supermen" (as one critic dubbed them), and a first "for the demanding New York public and critics," Merrill recalled. The event marked a precedent that eventually led to the "Three Tenors" concerts many years later. Merrill retired from the Met in 1976. In 1977, he appeared on the TV special "Sinatra & Friends," soloing "If I Were A Rich Man" and performing "The Oldest Established Permanent Floating Crap Game in New York" with Frank Sinatra and Dean Martin. For many years, he led services, often in Borscht Belt hotels, on Rosh Hashana and Yom Kippur.

In honor of Merrill's vast influence on American vocal music, on February 16, 1981, he was awarded the prestigious University of Pennsylvania Glee Club Award of Merit.
First awarded in 1964, the Award of Merit honors an individual that has "made a significant contribution to the world of music and helped to create a climate in which our talents may find valid expression."

In 1996, at a reception at Lincoln Center, Merrill was presented with The Lawrence Tibbett Award from the AGMA Relief Fund, honoring his fifty years of professional achievement and dedication to colleagues. The AGMA Relief Fund, award sponsor, provides financial assistance and support services to classical performing artists in need.

Sporting events
Relatively late in his singing career, Merrill also became known for singing "The Star-Spangled Banner" at Yankee Stadium and Giants Stadium. He first sang the national anthem to open the 1969 baseball season, and it became a tradition for the Yankees to bring him back each year on Opening Day and special occasions. He sang at various Old Timer's Days (wearing his own pinstriped Yankee uniform with the number "1" on the back) and the emotional pre-game ceremony in memory of Thurman Munson at Yankee Stadium on August 3, 1979, the day after the catcher died in a plane crash. Merrill also sang at one World Series game in each year the Yankees played the Fall Classic at the stadium, starting in 1976.  A recorded Merrill version is still sometimes used at Yankee Stadium, mainly at Old Timer's Day. In 2021, the Yankees replaced the live organ version of God Bless America that had played for almost two years with Merrill's cover.

Merrill preferred a traditional approach to the song, devoid of additional ornamentation, as he explained to Newsday in 2000, "When you sing the anthem, there's a legitimacy to it. I'm extremely bothered by these different interpretations of it." Merrill appeared opposite Adam Sandler in a scene singing the national anthem, in the 2003 film Anger Management. Merrill joked that an entire generation of people know him as "The 'Say-Can-You-See' guy!" (Agmazine, April 1996).

Personal life
While there has been dispute regarding his birth year (some claim he was born in 1919), the Social Security Death Index, his family, and his gravestone state that he was born in 1917.

Merrill was married briefly to soprano Roberta Peters in 1952. They parted amicably; he had two children, a son David and a daughter Lizanne, with his second wife, Marion (d. March 20, 2010), née Machno, a pianist. Merrill liked to play golf and was a member of the Westchester Country Club in Rye, New York, for many years.

He always maintained a warm sense of humor and once recalled the time a young contractor was working in his New Rochelle, New York, home. Surveying the photos, posters, plaques and other music memorabilia in the Merrill home, the young man asked Merrill, "You're a singer, aren't you?"
"Yes," he responded. "You sing opera, don't you?" the worker asked. "A little," replied Merrill.
(Agmazine, April 1996).

He wrote two books of memoirs, Once More from the Beginning (1965) and Between Acts (1976), and he co-authored a novel, The Divas (1978). Merrill toured all over the world with his arranger and conductor, Angelo DiPippo, who wrote most of his act and performed at concert halls throughout the world. He always donated his time on the Cerebral Palsy Telethon with Dennis James.

Death
Merrill died at his home in New Rochelle, New York, at the age 87, while watching Game 1 of the 2004 World Series between the Boston Red Sox and the St. Louis Cardinals. He is interred at the Sharon Gardens Cemetery in Valhalla, New York, which is the Jewish division of Kensico Cemetery. His headstone features an opera curtain that has been drawn open.

His epitaph states:
Like a bursting celestial star, he showered his family and the world with love, joy, and beauty. Encore please.

Performances with the Metropolitan Opera

Robert Merrill sang 769 performances with the Metropolitan Opera in the following 21 roles:

Studio recordings

Robert Merrill made at least 25 studio recordings of complete operas, including two Toscanini radio broadcasts:

See also
 A Salute to American Music (Richard Tucker Music Foundation Gala XVI, 1991)

Listen to
WNYC Soundcheck: Robert Merrill Remembered (October 26, 2004)

References

External links

Discography of opera recordings (Capon's Lists of Opera Recordings)
The New York Times, Obituary, October 26, 2004
"Great Singers Remembered: Robert Merrill" by Philip Ehrensaft. La Scena Musicale, May 14, 2005

United States National Medal of Arts recipients
New York Yankees
Musicians from Brooklyn
Jewish American musicians
Jewish classical musicians
1917 births
2004 deaths
American operatic baritones
RCA Victor artists
American people of Polish-Jewish descent
Musicians from New Rochelle, New York
Jewish opera singers
Burials at Kensico Cemetery
20th-century American male opera singers
Singers from New York City
People from Williamsburg, Brooklyn
Jewish American male actors
20th-century American male actors
Classical musicians from New York (state)
20th-century American memoirists
20th-century American novelists
Winners of the Metropolitan Opera Auditions of the Air
20th-century American Jews